Aphidicolan-16β-ol synthase (EC 4.2.3.42, PbACS) is an enzyme with systematic name 9α-copalyl-diphosphate diphosphate-lyase (aphidicolan-16β-ol-forming). This enzyme catalyses the following chemical reaction

 9α-copalyl diphosphate + H2O  aphidicolan-16β-ol + diphosphate

This is a bifunctional enzyme, which also has  activity.

References

External links 
 

EC 4.2.3